The Shade River is a tributary of the Ohio River in southeastern Ohio in the United States.

The Shade River flows predominantly as three streams, its east, middle, and west branches.  It is formed by the confluence of its middle and west branches, and collects its east branch shortly thereafter:

 The West Branch Shade River rises in Scipio Township in Meigs County, at an elevation of 853 feet (260 m), and flows east-southeastwardly through Bedford and Chester Townships.
 The Middle Branch Shade River rises southeast of the city of Athens in Athens Township in Athens County, at an elevation of 950 feet (290 m), and flows southeastwardly through Alexander, Lodi, and Carthage Townships in Athens County; and Bedford, Orange, and Chester Townships in Meigs County.
 The East Branch Shade River rises in Lodi Township in Athens County, at an elevation of 916 feet (279 m), and flows south-southeastwardly through Carthage Township in Athens County, and Orange and Chester Townships in Meigs County.

From the confluence of the middle and west branches in Chester Township, the Shade River flows generally eastwardly, past the community of Chester.  It collects its east branch from the north at the community of Keno, and enters the Ohio River in Olive Township, approximately one mile (2 km) south of the community of Long Bottom.

According to the Geographic Names Information System, the Shade River has also been known historically as "Shade Creek" and as "Devils Hole Creek."

Flow rate
At the United States Geological Survey's stream gauge downstream of Chester, the annual mean flow of the river between 1965 and 2012 was 174 cubic feet per second (5 cubic meters per second).  The highest recorded flow during the period was 15,600 cfs (442 m³/s) on March 2, 1997.  The lowest recorded flow was 0.00 cfs (0 m³/s) on September 5, 2007.

See also
 List of rivers of Ohio
 Shade River State Forest

References

Rivers of Ohio
Tributaries of the Ohio River
Rivers of Athens County, Ohio
Rivers of Meigs County, Ohio